The National Democratic Party (NDP) was a socialist African nationalist political party in Southern Rhodesia that was active from 1 January 1960 to 9 December 1961. The party was founded by Joshua Nkomo with the objective of achieving greater rights for the African majority of the country, but it was banned by the white minority government just a year into its existence. Ten days after the NDP was banned, Nkomo founded the Zimbabwe African People's Union.

History
On 1 January 1960, the National Democratic Party replaced the Southern Rhodesia African National Congress (SRANC), Chikerema and Nyandoro became members while still detained, and Nkomo came on as president on 28 November 1960. The NDP was an ideologically identical organisation to SRANC, although rural organising was nearly impossible after the Native Affairs Amendment Act.

References

1960 establishments in Southern Rhodesia
1961 disestablishments in Southern Rhodesia
African and Black nationalist parties in Africa
Political parties established in 1960
Political parties disestablished in 1961
Socialist parties in Zimbabwe